Amir al-Arabi Ali Gharib is a Libyan diplomat and Ambassador of Libya to Russia, presenting his credentials to Russian President Dmitry Medvedev on 12 October 2009.

He graduated from the Faculty of Missile Engineering in Kiev in 1984. In 1993 he defended his thesis at Ukrainian Academy of Air Defense
.

References

Living people
Ambassadors of Libya to Russia
Year of birth missing (living people)